Pandora (minor planet designation: 55 Pandora) is a fairly large and very bright asteroid in the asteroid belt. Pandora was discovered by American astronomer and Catholic priest George Mary Searle on September 10, 1858, from the Dudley Observatory near Albany, NY. It was his first and only asteroid discovery.

It is named after Pandora, the first woman in Greek mythology, who unwisely opened a box that released evil into the world. The name was apparently chosen by Blandina Dudley, widow of the founder of the Dudley Observatory, who had been involved in an acrimonious dispute with astronomer B. A. Gould. Gould felt that the name had an "apt significance". The asteroid shares its name with Pandora, a moon of Saturn.

Its orbital plane lies at an angle of 7.2° to the plane of the ecliptic. Photometric observations of this asteroid at the Rozhen Observatory in Bulgaria during 2010 gave a light curve with a period of 4.7992 hours and a brightness variation of Δm=0.22 mag. This is consistent with a period of 4.804 hours and an amplitude of 0.24 obtained during a 1977 study.

See also 
 Aubrite
 3103 Eger
 2867 Šteins

References

External links
 
 

Background asteroids
Pandora
Pandora
M-type asteroids (Tholen)
X-type asteroids (SMASS)
18580910